Abdol Hassan Kazemi (born November 10, 1963, in Abadan) is a retired Iranian football player who previously played for the Sanat Naft Abadan team. He was one of the most successful strikers in the Iran Koods League. In 1987, he was invited to Iran national football team.

References

1963 births
Living people
Sanat Naft Abadan F.C. players
Iranian footballers
Association football forwards
Iran international footballers